Hells Angels is a motorcycle club.

Hells Angels or Hell's Angels may also refer to:

Films
 Hell's Angels (film), a 1930 epic film about World War I combat pilots directed by Howard Hughes
 Hell's Angel (TV programme), a 1994 BBC television documentary about Mother Teresa by Christopher Hitchens

Music
 "Hell's Angel", sketch-song by Chevy Chase from National Lampoon Lemmings, 1973 
 "Hells Angels", by Roy Harper from Flat Baroque and Berserk, 1970

In print
 Hells Angels (manga), a Japanese manga series (2002–2004)
 Dark Angel (Marvel Comics), a comic book published by Marvel Comics in the 1990s, originally called Hell's Angel
 Hell's Angels: The Strange and Terrible Saga of the Outlaw Motorcycle Gangs, a 1966 book by Hunter S. Thompson

Military
 Hell's Angels (aircraft), the first B-17 to reach 25 combat missions over Europe in WW2
 "Hell's Angels", nickname of the 3rd Squadron of the Flying Tigers in World War II
 "Hell's Angels", nickname for the 303rd Bombardment Group unit of the United States Air Force

Other uses
 The Hell's Angels, a professional wrestling tag team in the UK in the 1960s, consisting of Adrian Street and Bobby Barnes

See also